Science Hill is a home rule-class city in Pulaski County, Kentucky, in the United States. The population was 693 as of the 2010 U.S. Census.

History
The community was named by geologist William J. Bobbitt, who visited to gather and analyze the local rocks, and applied to the local post office by William B. Gragg in 1874.

Geography
Science Hill is located at  (37.175284, -84.635654). The city is concentrated atop a small hill along Kentucky Route 635. Kentucky Route 1247 passes through the city just east of its downtown area, and U.S. Route 27 passes along the city's eastern border. The Big Clifty Creek Valley lies just to the west of Science Hill.

Demographics

As of the census of 2000, there were 634 people, 249 households, and 184 families residing in the city. The racial makeup of the city was 99.21% White, 0.16% Native American, and 0.63% from two or more races. Hispanic or Latino of any race were 0.63% of the population.

There were 249 households, out of which 33.3% had children under the age of 18 living with them, 61.4% were married couples living together, 10.8% had a female householder with no husband present, and 26.1% were non-families. 23.3% of all households were made up of individuals, and 14.1% had someone living alone who was 65 years of age or older. The average household size was 2.55 and the average family size was 3.02.

In the city, the population was spread out, with 24.8% under the age of 18, 8.0% from 18 to 24, 27.0% from 25 to 44, 25.4% from 45 to 64, and 14.8% who were 65 years of age or older. The median age was 39 years. For every 100 females, there were 86.5 males. For every 100 females age 18 and over, there were 80.0 males.

The median income for a household in the city was $34,464, and the median income for a family was $43,125. Males had a median income of $27,917 versus $18,583 for females. The per capita income for the city was $14,476. About 11.2% of families and 15.6% of the population were below the poverty line, including 25.5% of those under age 18 and 9.0% of those age 65 or over.

Education
The Science Hill Independent School was founded in 1895. Since then it has moved several times to accommodate growth. The school enrolls students from pre-school up to the 8th grade. Since the school is independent, students graduating from Science Hill can choose either the county or Somerset City High Schools. Though the school has an enrollment of around 500, it consistently ranks among the highest-performing primary and elementary schools in the Commonwealth of Kentucky.

Science Hill has a lending library, a branch of the Pulaski County Public Library.

In popular culture
Science Hill is referenced in the 2014 movie Edge of Tomorrow, as the hometown of Master Sergeant Farell (played by Bill Paxton). The source of the town name is unknown (to the character), and Master Sergeant Farell says he "Never asked, don't care."

References

External links

Cities in Pulaski County, Kentucky
Cities in Kentucky